Moored-4 (锚-4, Mao-4) moored mine developed by Fengxi Machinery Factory (汾西机器厂) was accepted into service in November 1973, and it is the first moored mine in the Chinese service that incorporates acoustic fuze. The mine can be planted by both the surface ships and submarines from depth of 20–200 meters, and it weighs 600 kg. The mine has an effective radius of 20 meters and effective life of 2 years. The original Moored-4 was upgraded to Moored-4-I (锚-4甲, Mao-4-Jia) standard in November 1982, and subsequently upgraded into Moored-4-II (锚-4乙, Mao-4-Yi) standard by December 1985. In comparison to earlier versions, the latest version adopted large scale integrated circuits.

Naval mines of the People's Republic of China